Passion Leaves a Trace is the third LP by American alternative rock band Black Lab. The album featured the track "Mine Again," which, as part of the "Bum Rush the Charts" program peaked at #11 on the U.S. rock chart. The campaign had a significant international impact, selling songs in every country in which iTunes has stores and pushing "Mine Again" to #53 on the Canadian chart (#10 rock), #15 in the Netherlands (#2 rock) and #73 in Germany (#12 rock), among others.

Tracks from Passion Leaves a Trace have been used on several Canadian and US TV programs: Durham County used "Weightless", "The Window" and "This Night"; Flashpoint and Banshee used "Weightless"; and Killjoys used "This Night".

Track listing

Personnel
Credits adapted from AllMusic.
 Michael Belfer – background vocals, bass, guitar, producer
 Isaac Carpenter – drums
 Matt Chamberlain – drums
 Mark Comstock – bass
 Paul Durham – acoustic guitar, bass, electric guitar, guitar, keyboards, layout design, organ, percussion, producer, programming, synthesizer, vocals
 Andy Ellis – bass, keyboards, mixing, producer, programming, synthesizer, vocals, wah-wah guitar
 Marti Frederiksen – background vocals, bass,  guitar, keyboards, producer, programming
 Rick Pier O'Neil – mastering
 Brian Paturalski – bass,   guitar, keyboards, mixing, producer, programming

References

2007 albums
Black Lab albums